James La Fayette Cottrell (August 25, 1808 – September 7, 1885) was a U.S. Representative from Alabama.

Born near King William, Virginia, Cottrell completed preparatory studies.
He studied law.
He was admitted to the bar in 1830 and commenced practice in Hayneville, Alabama.
He served as member of the Alabama House of Representatives in 1834, 1836, and 1837.
He served in the State senate 1838-1841, and was president of that body in 1840.

Cottrell was elected as a Democrat to the Twenty-ninth Congress to fill the vacancy caused by the resignation of William L. Yancey and served from December 7, 1846, to March 3, 1847.
He moved to Florida in 1854.
He served in the Florida Senate in 1865–1885.
He was appointed collector of customs at Cedar Keys, Florida, and served until his death in that city September 7, 1885.
He was interred in Old Town Cemetery, Old Town, Florida.

References

External links

1808 births
1885 deaths
Democratic Party Alabama state senators
Democratic Party Florida state senators
Democratic Party members of the Alabama House of Representatives
Democratic Party members of the United States House of Representatives from Alabama
People from King William County, Virginia
People from Hayneville, Alabama
19th-century American politicians